Tân Trụ is a township and capital of Tân Trụ District, Long An Province, Vietnam.

References

Populated places in Long An province
District capitals in Vietnam
Townships in Vietnam